Naro is a village to the south of Veranaaso on the northwest coast of Guadalcanal, Solomon Islands. The population is predominantly Roman Catholic.

References

Populated places in Guadalcanal Province